Cristiano Giuseppe Ficco (born 5 April 2001) is an Italian weightlifter. He won the gold medal in the 85 kg event at the 2018 Summer Youth Olympics held in Buenos Aires, Argentina.

At the 2018 Mediterranean Games held in Tarragona, Catalonia, Spain, he won the gold medal in the 85 kg Snatch event. At the 2021 European Junior & U23 Weightlifting Championships in Rovaniemi, Finland, he won the gold medal in his event.

He won the bronze medal in the men's 102 kg Snatch event at the 2022 Mediterranean Games held in Oran, Algeria.

References

External links 
 

Living people
2001 births
Place of birth missing (living people)
Italian male weightlifters
Competitors at the 2018 Mediterranean Games
Competitors at the 2022 Mediterranean Games
Mediterranean Games medalists in weightlifting
Mediterranean Games gold medalists for Italy
Mediterranean Games bronze medalists for Italy
Weightlifters at the 2018 Summer Youth Olympics
Youth Olympic gold medalists for Italy
21st-century Italian people